Passion Island is a 1927 British silent drama film directed by Manning Haynes and starring Lilian Oldland, Moore Marriott and Randle Ayrton. It is based on a novel by W. W. Jacobs and concerns a vendetta on the island of Corsica.

Cast
 Lilian Oldland - Josette Bernatti
 Moore Marriott - Beppo
 Randle Ayrton - Paolo Bernatti
 Walter Byron - Tony
 Dacia Deane - Santa
 Gladys Hamer - Clare
 Leal Douglas - Desirée
 Johnny Butt - Tomasco

References

Bibliography
 Low, Rachael. History of the British Film, 1918-1929. George Allen & Unwin, 1971.

External links

1927 films
1927 drama films
Films based on British novels
Films based on works by W. W. Jacobs
Films directed by H. Manning Haynes
Films set in Corsica
British drama films
British silent feature films
British black-and-white films
1920s English-language films
1920s British films
Silent drama films